Amresh Kumar Singh is currently an independent Nepalese politician who has been member of Nepali Congress in past serving as the Member of the House of Representatives elected from Sarlahi 4 .  The House of Representatives became the lower house of the Federal Parliament of Nepal and its first election was held in 2017 in which he was elected from Nepali Congress Party. He got elected as Member of Parliament again in the general elections held in 2022 as an Independent candidate. He was also elected to the 2nd Nepalese Constituent Assembly in 2014 from Sarlahi 6.

Political career 
He was a member of the State Management and Good Governance Committee in the House of Representatives.

References

Living people
Nepal MPs 2017–2022
Nepali Congress politicians from Madhesh Province
Members of the 2nd Nepalese Constituent Assembly
1970 births
Nepal MPs 2022–present